Posht Meleh may refer to:

Posht Meleh, Khorramabad
Posht Meleh, Bayravand

See also
Posht-e Meleh Sangar